Suchithra Alexander (born 14 October 1972), is a former Sri Lankan cricketer. He captained his side on his debut for the Sri Lanka Under 19s during their tour of England, against the England Under 19s. In the three match series, in which he captained all three matches, he lost one and drew the other two. A bowler with the ability to add runs in the lower-middle order, scoring several half-centuries, he went on to play First-class cricket for Colts Cricket Club.

References

Sri Lankan cricketers
1972 births
Living people
Colts Cricket Club cricketers
Basnahira North cricketers